Nam Da-won (born April 16, 1997), known mononymously as Dawon, is a South Korean singer and actress. She is a member of the South Korean girl group WJSN.

Early life
Dawon was born on April 16, 1997. She graduated from Chungdam High School.

Career

Pre-debut 
Dawon appeared on the second season of the South Korean reality television competition show K-pop Star 2, which aired in 2012. She joined Starship Entertainment as a trainee sometime afterwards.

2016–present: Debut with WJSN and solo activities 

On February 25, 2016, made her debut with WJSN with their first EP, Would You Like?, and its lead singles, "Mo Mo Mo" and "Catch Me".

On July 14, 2016, Dawon's first soundtrack appearance, "Shalala Romance", was released for the television series Lucky Romance. Later in 2016, Dawon appeared as a contestant on the singing competition show Girl Spirit, which aired on JTBC from July 19 to September 27. On November 8, 2016, Dawon, along with labelmate Junggigo, released the single "I Will Love You Piece By Piece" for the soundtrack of the television series Sweet Stranger and Me. On December 17, 2016, Dawon and fellow WJSN member Yeonjung released a Korean recording of "Fire & Ice", a song from the soundtrack of the Russian children's film The Snow Queen 3: Fire and Ice.
On November 5, 2017, "Go Ready Go", was released as part of the soundtrack for the television series Revolutionary Love.

In 2020, Dawon was cast as a lead in the musical movie K-School. The release of the film was originally scheduled for December of 2020, but currently there is no confirmation as to when the release will be rescheduled due to controversy involving a cast member.

Dawon together with Yeonjung participated in Immortal Songs: Singing the Legend. They performed with Xitsuh and Koo Jun-yup and eventually became the final winner. On August 10, Dawon and Yeonjung released a cover song of Taeyeon's "Starlight" for NORAE-ing LIVE of Time. The pair went on to make an appearance on Jo Se-ho's Jo Se-ho's Wine Bar.

On March 3, 2023, Starship Entertainment announced Dawon chosen not to renew her contract with the label however it wasn't explicitly stated if she had left the group.

Personal life 
On February 22, 2022, Dawon's agency confirmed that she will temporarily suspend activities due to anxiety. The plan is to focus on her treatment.

Discography

As lead artist

Soundtrack appearances

Composition credits
All song credits are adapted from the Korea Music Copyright Association's database unless stated otherwise.

Filmography

Film

Television shows

Notes

References

External links

 

1997 births
Living people
People from Seoul
Mandarin-language singers of South Korea
Starship Entertainment artists
K-pop Star participants
South Korean female idols
South Korean women pop singers
Cosmic Girls members
21st-century South Korean women singers
Singers from Seoul
21st-century South Korean singers
21st-century South Korean actresses
South Korean film actresses
Actresses from Seoul